French euro coins feature three separate designs for the three series of coins. The minor series was designed by Fabienne Courtiade, the middle one by Laurent Jurio and the major two coins are by Joaquin Jimenez. All designs share the 12 stars of the EU and the year of imprint as well as the letters "RF" for République Française (French Republic).

French euro design
For images of the common side and a detailed description of the coins, see euro coins. To coincide with the French Presidency of the Council of the European Union, and the 20th anniversary of euro coins, the French national designs on the 1 and 2 euro coins have been changed. The new designs were approved by the Council of the European Union on 26 July 2021 and have been revealed to the public on 16 December 2021 ahead of their entry into circulation in 2022.

French series 2024 Summer Olympics

Circulating Mintage quantities
The following table shows the mintage quantity for all French euro coins, per denomination, per year.

References

External links

 The visual characteristics of the Euro coins: France Official Journal of the European Communities
European Central Bank – France

Euro coins by issuing country
Euro coins
Euro